Kedah Royal Mausoleum or Langgar Royal Mausoleum is a Kedah royal burial grounds. It is located in Langgar, Kota Setar District, Kedah, Malaysia.

List of graves

Sultan graves
 Muhammad Jiwa Zainal Adilin Mu'adzam Shah II (died 1778)
 Abdullah Mukarram Shah (died 1797)
 Ahmad Tajuddin Halim Shah II (died 1843)
 Zainal Rashid Al-Mu'adzam Shah I (died 1854)
 Ahmad Tajuddin Mukarram Shah (died 1879)
 Zainal Rashid Mu'adzam Shah II (died 1881)
 Sultan Abdul Hamid Halim Shah ibni Almarhum Sultan Ahmad Tajuddin Mukarram Shah (died 1943)
 Sultan Badlishah ibni Almarhum Sultan Abdul Hamid Halim Shah (died 1958)
 Sultan Abdul Halim Mu'adzam Shah Al-Haj ibni Almarhum Sultan Badlishah (died 2017)

Sultanah graves
 Paduka Seri Cik Menyelara
 Tunku Sofiah binti Almarhum Tunku Mahmud
 Sultanah Asmah binti Almarhum Sultan Badrul Alam Shah
 Sultanah Bahiyah binti Almarhum Tuanku Abdul Rahman (died 2003)

Royal family graves
 Tunku Dato' Sri Mohammad Jewa ibni Almarhum Sultan Abdul Hamid Halim Shah – Tunku Temenggong Kedah, elder brother of Tunku Abdul Rahman Putra Al-Haj (died 1977)
 Tunku Abdul Rahman Putra Al-Haj ibni Almarhum Sultan Abdul Hamid Halim Shah – First Malaysian Prime Minister, also known as "Father of Malayan Independence" or "Father of Malaysia" (died 1990)
 General Tunku Tan Sri Osman ibni Almarhum Tunku Mohammad Jewa – First Malaysian Armed Forces Chief (died 1994)
 Tun Sharifah Rodziah binti Syed Alwi Barakbah – Wife of the first Malaysian Prime Minister Tunku Abdul Rahman Putra and First Lady of Malaysia (died 2000)
 Tunku Ismail ibni Almarhum Tunku Mohammad Jewa – Universiti Sains Malaysia (USM) dean (died 2009)
 Tunku Annuar ibni Almarhum Sultan Badlishah – Tunku Bendahara of Kedah and also Chairman of the Council of Regency of Kedah during his brother, Sultan Abdul Halim Muadzam Shah became 14th Yang di-Pertuan Agong (2011 - 2016) (died 2014)
 Tunku Raudzah binti Almarhum Sultan Hishamuddin Alam Shah – Raja Puan Muda of Kedah and also consort of Tunku Abdul Malik ibni Almarhum Sultan Badlishah, Raja Muda of Kedah (died 2015)
 Tunku Hamidah binti Almarhum Sultan Badlishah – sister of the 14th Yang di-Pertuan Agong, Tuanku Abdul Halim Muadzam Shah of Kedah (died 2015)
 Tunku Abdul Malik ibni Almarhum Sultan Badlishah – Raja Muda of Kedah (died 2015)
 Tunku Sarina binti Almarhum Sultan Abdul Halim (died 1991)

Leaders' graves

Menteri Besar of Kedah
 Wan Mat Saman (died 1898)

References

External links
 

Buildings and structures in Kedah
Kota Setar District
Mausoleums in Malaysia